Čerchov is the highest mountain in the Upper Palatine Forest, at  above sea level.

Location
The peak of Čerchov lies about 2 km from the Czech-German border.

History
After its use by the Wehrmacht in the Second World War the summit was intensively used by the Warsaw Pact until the 1990s as a surveillance station and was placed out of bounds to the public. In addition to the observation tower erected in 1904 by Vilém Kurz and known as the Kurz Tower, a second, larger tower was built in 1987 by the Czechoslovak Army which is used today for flight safety purposes and is not accessible. The corresponding NATO communication station was located on the Hoher Bogen about 20 km away to the southeast. Other surveillance posts were sited inter alia on the Velký Zvon (German: Plattenberg, with a tower of very similar design built in 1978 and which had line-of-sight to the Čerchov site) and the Dyleň. As well as the Soviet Army the site was also used by Hauptabteilung III of the East German Stasi as a listening post (codenamed RUBIN). Following the opening of the border and reunification of Germany the listening posts were closed and from July 2000 the Kurz Tower has been accessible once more. The mountain offers an all-round view of the Bavarian Forest and the Czech Plain. In good weather conditions, the Alps may be seen. There is an amateur radio on the mountain.

References

External links

 Die Geschichte des Čerchov
 Čerchov-Diashow auf waldberge.de

One-thousanders of the Czech Republic
Mountains and hills of the Czech Republic
Observation towers in the Czech Republic
Mountains and hills of the Upper Palatine Forest